B-Max Racing Co., Ltd  also known as B-Max Racing Team and B-Max Engineering is a race car builder and racing team headquartered in Ayase, Kanagawa.

History
Byobugaura Kogyo Co., Ltd. established the race division "B-Max Engineering" in 2009, and started participating in Super FJ and Porsche Carrera Cup Japan in 2010. Since then, the participation category has been expanded.  Ryuji Kumita, the president and team representative, competes in the race himself under the pseudonym "Dragon".

In 2014, the team name was changed to "B-Max Racing Team" (Vehicle Division). In addition, from the same year, instead of Nova Engineering, B-Max Racing was entrusted with the team management of NDDP Racing, which they participate in the Super GT in the GT300 class and the Japanese Formula 3 Championship.  They have also participated in Super Formula Championship since 2017, and in November of the same year, spun off from Byobugaura Kogyo Co., Ltd. as B-MAX RACING Co., Ltd. They participated in the Super GT in the GT500 class in 2018.  In 2019, they participated in Super Formula with two cars, in collaboration with the German racing team Motopark Academy.

Current series results

Super Formula

In detail
(key) (Races in bold indicate pole position) (Races in italics indicate fastest lap)

Super Formula Lights

Formula Regional Japanese Championship

F4 Japanese Championship

Complete Super GT results
(key) (Races in bold indicate pole position) (Races in italics indicate fastest lap)

‡ Half points awarded as less than 75% of race distance was completed.

Former series results

F3 Asian Championship

† Koyama drove for BlackArts Racing Team in round 3. 

‡ Guest driver

References

External links
Official website

Japanese racecar constructors
Japanese auto racing teams
Formula Nippon teams
Super Formula teams
Super GT teams
Japanese Formula 3 Championship teams
Honda in motorsport
Nissan in motorsport
Auto racing teams established in 2010
Formula Regional teams